Wangtan may refer to the following places in China:

 Wangtan, Laoting County (王滩镇), town in Laoting County, Hebei
 Wangtan, Shaoxing County (王坛镇), town in Shaoxing County, Zhejiang
 Wangtan, Jiangsu (王滩村), village in northwestern Jiangsu

See also 

 Wangtang (disambiguation)